Globoko is a village in the Municipality of Brežice in eastern Slovenia. The area is part of the traditional region of Styria. It is now included in the Lower Sava Statistical Region.

A V-shaped monument in the village was erected in 1953 and renovated in 1985 to commemorate 34 local Partisans and 57 other victims of the Second World War.

References

External links
Globoko on Geopedia

Populated places in the Municipality of Brežice